Michael Simon White (16 January 1936 – 7 March 2016) was a British theatrical impresario and film producer. White was responsible for 101 stage productions and 27 films over 50 years.

Early life
Michael White was born in Glasgow, Scotland, the son of Victor White, a merchant who ran a glove making business, and Doris (née Cohen), a property developer. His parents were from Eastern European Jewish backgrounds. As White suffered from asthma as a boy, his parents decided he would be educated as a boarder at the Lyceum Alpinum Zuoz in Switzerland from age 7, where he was the only boy who did not speak the French language. He then graduated from the Sorbonne in Paris.

Career
After working as a Wall Street runner in New York City in the 1950s, White took an interest in theatre, spending five years as assistant to Sir Peter Daubeny for his World Theatre seasons in London.

White produced his first West End play, the London premiere of Jack Gelber's The Connection in 1961. Known for bringing the risqué to the stage his productions included Sleuth, Oh! Calcutta!, Two Gentlemen of Verona and the original Theatre Upstairs production of The Rocky Horror Show.

Concurrently, White produced films, including the film version of The Rocky Horror Picture Show and Monty Python and the Holy Grail (both 1975). Later, he was responsible for The Comic Strip Presents... with Peter Richardson, which began on the opening night of Channel 4 in 1982.

However, losses on films mounted, and he was declared bankrupt in 2005 after suffering a heart attack at the Mondrian Hotel in Los Angeles.

Media
White's autobiography, Empty Seats, was published in 1985.

White's life story was the subject of the 2013 documentary film The Last Impresario, directed by Gracie Otto. The film made its world premiere at the BFI London Film Festival in October 2013, where it was positively received by critics.

Personal life
White was married twice. With his first wife, the 1960s model and designer Sarah Hillsdon (1965-1972), he had three children. In 1985, he married Louise Moores, 26 years his junior, daughter of John Moores, of the family that owned the Littlewoods pools, mail order and retail group; they had a son.

White died on 7 March 2016 of heart failure, aged 80.

Selected theatrical productions
This list is incomplete, currently listing only White's most notable theatre works:

Musicals
As producer:
 Oh! Calcutta! (1970, West End)
 Joseph and the Amazing Technicolor Dreamcoat (1973, West End)
 The Rocky Horror Show (1973, West End)
 Two Gentlemen of Verona (1973, West End)
 A Chorus Line (1976, West End)
 Annie (1978, West End)
 She Loves Me (1994, West End revival)

Plays
As producer:
 Sleuth (1971, Broadway)
 City Sugar (1978)

Filmography
As producer or executive producer:
 Monty Python and the Holy Grail (1974)
 The Rocky Horror Picture Show (1975)
 Jabberwocky (1977)
 The Hound of the Baskervilles (1978)
 Going with the Wind (1981)
 My Dinner With Andre (1981)
 Polyester (1981)
 Shock Treatment (1981)
 Countryman (1982)
 Moonlighting (1982)
 Urgh! A Music War (1982)
 The Comic Strip Presents... (1982)
 Dead on Time (1983)
 Heat and Dust (1983)
 The Ploughman's Lunch (1983)
 Strangers Kiss (1983)
 The Supergrass (1985)
 High Season (1987)
 Eat the Rich (1987)
 White Mischief (1987)
 The Deceivers (1988)
 Nuns on the Run (1989)
 The Pope Must Die (1991)
 Robert's Movie (1994)
 Widows' Peak (1994)
 Enigma (2001)
Appearing as himself:
 The Last Impresario (2013)

References

External links
 
 
 Obituary in The Independent by Marcus Williamson

1936 births
2016 deaths
Theatre people from Glasgow
Scottish people of Jewish descent
University of Paris alumni
Impresarios
Scottish theatre managers and producers
Scottish film producers
Burials at Westwood Village Memorial Park Cemetery
20th-century Scottish businesspeople
Alumni of Lyceum Alpinum Zuoz